Charles Victor-Thomas (1871–1908) was a French military officer, a journalist and an author, known for his writing as a war correspondent during the Russo-Japanese War.

In 1904, Captain Victor-Thomas was permitted to Join General Kuroki's Japanese First Army.  His own military background in the French army informed his perspective and his writing.  He was a reporter for Le Gaulois  and Le Temps, both of which were published in Paris.

Selected works
Victor-Thomas's published writings encompass 3 works in 4 publications in 1 language and 16 library holdings.

 1905 —  Trois mois avec Kuroki. Notes d'un correspondant de guerre français attaché à la lre armée japonaise. Paris: A. Challamel. OCLC 077102298
 1902 —  Amériques & Américains. Paris: A. Challamel. OCLC 003105987

See also
 Military attachés and observers in the Russo-Japanese War

Notes

References
 McKenzie, Fred Arthur. (1905).  From Tokyo to Tiflis: Uncensored Letters from the War. London: Hurst and Blackett. OCLC  150535265
 Sisemore, James D. (2003).  Sisemore, James D. (2003).  "The Russo-Japanese War, Lessons Not Learned."  U.S. Army Command and General Staff College.

1871 births
1908 deaths
War correspondents of the Russo-Japanese War
French male non-fiction writers